Randall Christoph Herman Lesaffer (born 25 April 1968) is a Belgian historian of international law. He has been professor of legal history at KU Leuven since 1998 and at Tilburg University since 1999, where he also served as dean of Tilburg Law School from 2008 to 2012. He currently serves as the head of the Department of Roman Law and Legal History at the Faculty of Law and Criminology at KU Leuven. His work focuses on the Early Modern Age (16-18th centuries).

Career
Lesaffer was born in 1968 in Bruges, the town where he continues to live. He studied law as well as history at the universities of Ghent and Leuven (University of Leuven), both in Belgium. In 1998, he obtained his PhD in law from the Leuven on a study on early-modern and Cold War peace and alliance treaties. Since 1998 he has been part-time professor of legal history at KU leuven, and full-time since 2019, where he also serves as the head of the Department of Roman Law and Legal History. He is also professor of legal history at Tilburg University, since 1999 (part-time since 2019).

Lesaffer's work on the history (particularly, in early-modern Europe) as well as recent developments of international law, in the context of international relations and policy. He is currently involved, with writing a political history of international law at the end of the Cold War.

He also publishes on general European legal history and constitutional history. He is among others author of European Legal History: A Political and Cultural Perspective by Cambridge University Press. 

Lesaffer has published extensively in the field of the history of international law, particularly in early-modern Europe. Lesaffer is
 the editor of the Oxford Historical Treaties, a digitisation of historical treaties,
 general editor of the book series Studies in the History of International Law (Brill), 
 editor of the Global Law Series (Cambridge UP), 
 editor of the Journal of the History of International Law,
 president of the Grotiana foundation (Stichting Grotiana),
 general editor of the Cambridge History of International Law (15 volumes planned).

Lesaffer was dean of Tilburg Law School from 2008 to 2012.  During his term the school launched an English-taught Bachelor in Law on ‘Global Law’ and made globalisation the core of its strategy.  Lesaffer co-founded the Law Schools Global League in 2012 and was one of its two founding presidents. The League is an association of about 25 law schools from all over the world to work around globalisation. He is also visiting professor at the Católica Global Law School in Lisbon.

He has been actively involved in local politics in Bruges since the 1990s. He was chairman of the VLD (liberal party) in Bruges from 1993 to 2001 and served as a member of the city-council for CD&V in 2011-2012.  He was a member and vice-president of the Port Authority of the harbour of Bruges-Zeebruges from 1999 till 2014.

Publications

Books and articles in English
His main publications are:
 Peace treaties and international law in European history. From the Late Middle Ages to World War One, Cambridge University Press, 2008
 European Legal History: A Cultural and Political Perspective, Cambridge, Cambridge University Press, 2009 (2nd and 3rd print 2010), a textbook on legal history in general.

His many publications include:
 The Westphalia Peace Treaties and the Development of the Tradition of Great European Peace Treaties prior to 1648, in: Grotiana, NS 17 (1997) 71-95.
 The International Dimension of the Westphalia Peace Treaties. A Juridical Approach in: 350 años de la Paz de Westfalia. Del antagonismo a la integración en Europa. Ciclo de conferencias celebrado en la Biblioteca Nacional, Madrid 9 de marzo a 30 de noviembre de 1998 (Madrid, 1999) 291-310 
 The concepts of war and peace in the 15th century treaties of Arras in: Denis Clauzel, Charles Giry-Deloison and Christophe Leduc, edd., Arras et la diplomatie européenne XVe-XVIe siècles (Arras, 1999) 165-182.
 The Medieval Canon Law of Contract and Early Modern Treaty Law, in: Journal of the History of International Law, 2 (2000) 178-198
 War, Peace, Interstate Friendship and the Emergence of the jus publicum Europaeum in: Ronald G. Asch, Wulf Eckart Voss and Martin Wrede, edd., Frieden und Krieg in der frühen Neuzeit. Die europäische Staatenordnung und die aussereuropäische Welt (Munich, 2001) 87-113.
 The Grotian Tradition Revisited: Change and Continuity in the History of International Law, in: British Yearbook of International Law, 73 (2002) 103-139.
 (with Dirk van den Auweele) Education and Research in Roman Law and Legal History in Belgium and the Netherlands in: Kjell A. Modeer, ed., Rättshistoria I förändring (Lund, 2002) 265-279.
 An Early Treatise on Peace Treaties: Petrus Gudelinus between Roman Law and Modern Practice, in: Journal of Legal History, 23 (2002) 223-252.
 Amicitia in Renaissance Peace and Alliance Treaties, in: Journal of the History of International Law, 4 (2002) 77-99.
 The Yerodia Case, in: Tilburg Foreign Law Review, 10 (2002) 194-205.
 Introduction in: Randall Lesaffer (ed.), Peace Treaties and International Law in European History: From the Late Middle Ages to World War One (Cambridge, 2004) 1-6.
 Peace Treaties from Lodi to Westphalia in: Randall Lesaffer (ed.), Peace Treaties and International Law in European History: From the Late Middle Ages to World War One (Cambridge, 2004) 9-44.
 Conclusion in: Randall Lesaffer (ed.), Peace Treaties and International Law in European History: From the Late Middle Ages to World War One (Cambridge, 2004) 399-411.
 A Short Legal History of the Netherlands in: Sanne Taekema (ed.), Understanding Dutch Law (The Hague, 2004) 31-58.
 Charles V, Monarchia Universalis and the Law of Nations, in: Legal History Review, 71 (2003) 79-123.
 Argument from Roman Law in Current International Law: Occupation and Acquisitive Prescription, in: European Journal of International Law, 16 (2005) 25-58.
 (with Dominique Bauer,) Ivo of Chartres, the Gregorian Reform and the Formation of the Just War Doctrine, in: Journal of the History of International Law, 7 (2005) 43-54 (author of 43-45 and 54).
 Defensive Warfare, Prevention and Hegemony: The Justification for the Franco-Spanish War of 1635, in: Journal of the History of International Law, 8 (2006) 91-123 and 141-179.
 The Influence of the Medieval Canon Law of Contract on Early Modern Treaty Law, in: Manlio Bellomo and Orazio Condorelli, Proceedings of the Eleventh International Congress of Medieval Canon Law, Monumenta Iuris Canonici Series C: Subsidia 12 (Vatican City, 2006) 449-467. 
 Siege Warfare and the Early Modern Laws of War, in: Erik-Jan Broers, Beatrix Jacobs and Randall Lesaffer, eds., Ius Brabanticum, Ius Commune, Ius Gentium: Opstellen aangeboden aan prof. mr. J.P.A. Coopmans ter gelegenheid van zijn tachtigste verjaardag, Nijmegen, Wolf, 2006, 87-110.
 Introduction: Taming the Leviathan, in: Randall Lesaffer and Georges Macours, Sovereignty and the Law of Nations (16th-18th centuries), Iuris Scripta Historiae 20, Brussels, 2006, 5-10.
 Siege Warfare in the Early Modern Age: A study on the customary laws of war, in: Amanda Perreau-Saussine and James B. Murphy, eds, The Nature of Customary Law: Legal, Historical and Philosophical Perspectives¸ Cambridge, 2007, 176-202.
 International Law and its History: The Story of an Unrequited Love, in: Matthew Craven, Malgosia Fitzmaurice and Maria Vogiatzi (eds.), Time, History and International Law, Leiden/Boston, Martinus Nijhoff, 2007, 27-41.
 Alberico Gentili’s ius post bellum and Early Modern Peace Treaties, in: Benedict Kingsbury and Benjamin Straumann, The Roman Foundations of the Law of Nations: Alberico Gentili and the Justice of Empire (Oxford, 2010) 210-240.
 A Schoolmaster Abolishing Homework? Vattel on peacemaking and peace treaties in: Vincent Chetail and Peter Haggenmacher, eds., Vattel's International Law from a XXIst Century Perspective/Le droit international de Vattel vu du XXIe siècle, Graduate Institute of International Law and Development Studies 9, Leiden/Boston, Brill, 2011, 353-384.
 Law and History: Law between Past and Present in Bart van Klink and Sanne Taekema, eds., Law and Method: Interdisciplinary Research into Law, Tübingen, 2011, 133-152.
(with E.J.M.F.C. Broers,) Private property in the Dutch-Spanish Peace Treaty of Münster (30 January 1648), in: Zeitschrift für Historische Forschung, Beihefte, 45(1), 2011, 165-195.
 The Classical Law of Nations (1500-1800), in: A. Orakhelashvili (Ed.), Research handbook on the theory and history of international law (pp. 408-440), Chelthenham-Northampton, MA, Edward Elgar Publishing. (Research Handbooks in International Law, 5).
(with Kubben, R.M.H.,) A short legal history of the Netherlands, in: In S. Taekema, A. de Roo, & C. Elion-Valter (Eds.), Understanding Dutch law (pp. 35-74). The Hague, Eleven, 2011.
 Roman Law and the Early Historiography of International Law, Ward, Wheaton, Hosack and Walker, in: T. Marauhn & H. Steiger (Eds.), Universality and Continuity in International Law (pp. 149-184). The Hague, Eleven International Publishing, 2011.
 Kellogg-Briand Pact (1928), in: R. Wolfrum (Ed.), Max Planck Encyclopedia of Public International Law, Oxford, Oxford University Press.
  The end of the Cold War: A epochal event in the history of international law?, in: J. Crawford & S. Nouwen (Eds.), International Law 1989-2010: A Performance Appraisal, Cambridge 2–4 September 2010 (pp. 45-59), Oxford and Portland, Or., Hart, 2012.
 (with W.A.M. van der Linden,) Peace Treaties after World War I, in: R. Wolfrum (Ed.), Max Planck Encyclopedia of Public International Law, Oxford, Oxford University Press, 2012.
 Peace Treaties and the Formation of International Law, in: Bardo Fassbender and Anne Peters (Eds.), The Oxford Handbook of the History of International Law (pp. 71-94). Oxford, Oxford University Press, 2012.
 The Lighthouse of Law’, in: Tilburg Law Review, 17, 2012, 153-158.
(with Rianne Letschert,) The Global Challenge to Public International Law: Some First Thoughts, in: Tilburg Law Review, 17, 2012, 256-262.
The Temple of Peace. The Hague Peace Conference, Andrew Carnegie and the Building of the Peace Palace (1898-1913), in: Mededelingen van de Koninklijke Nederlandse Vereniging voor Internationaal Recht, Preadviezen 140 (2013) 1-39.
 (with Erik-Jan Broers and Johanna Waelkens,) From Antwerp to Munster (1609/1648): Truce and Peace under the Law of Nations in: Randall Lesaffer (ed.), 'The Twelve Years Truce (1609). Peace, Truce, War and Law in the Low Countries at the Turn of the 17th Century', Studies in the History of International Law 6, Leiden en Boston, Brill/Nijhoff, 2014, 233-255.
 Too Much History: From War as Sanction to the Sanctioning of War, in: Marc Weller (ed.), Oxford Handbook of the Use of Force in International Law, Oxford University Press 2015.

Books and articles in other languages
 Moet vrede rechtvaardig zijn? Het vredesconcept in de historische ontwikkeling van het internationaal recht, Inaugural lecture in occasion of the acceptance of the Chair of Legal History at Tilburg University, Tilburg University Press, 1999
 Europa: een zoektocht naar vrede?  Het klassieke statensysteem in vredes- en alliantieverdragen (1453-1763 en 1945-1997), Leuven University Press, 1999
 Inleiding tot de Europese Rechtsgeschiedenis, Leuven, University Press, 2004, 2de herziene uitgave 2008.
 Vernulaeus, Zypaeus en Tuldenus: het recht van de oorlog in de Spaanse Nederlanden tijdens de laatste fase van de Tachtigjarige Oorlog (1621-1648), in: Ex Officina, 8 (1991) 32-70.
 Le Journal des Tribunaux (1904-1914). De Belgisch-Nederlandse betrekkingen vanuit het standpunt van de Belgische nationalisten in: Fred Stevens en Dirk van den Auweele, (edd.), Uuytwysens d'Archiven. Handelingen van de XIde Belgisch-Nederlandse Rechtshistorische Dagen, Leuven 22–23 November 1990 (Leuven, 1992) 107-139.
 In de marge van de rechtsgeschiedenis? Politieke verdragen als rechtshistorische bron, Bulletin des Ancien Pays et Assemblées d’Etat, 5 (1997) 60-76. 
 Tussen respublica christiana en ius publicum europaeum: de ontwikkeling van de Europese rechtsordening in alliantieverdragen van de vroege Nieuwe Tijd (1450-1600) in: Beatrix Jacobs (ed.), De rechtspraktijk in beeld. Van Justinianus tot de Duitse bezetting. Handelingen van het XIVde Belgisch-Nederlands Rechtshistorisch Congres. Katholieke Universiteit Brabant. Tilburg, 24 en 25 januari 1997 (Tilburg, 1997) 95-127.
 Het moderne volkenrecht (1450-1750), in: Onze Alma Mater, 52 (1998) 426-451.
 La dimensión internacional de los Tratados de Paz de Westfalia. Un enfoque jurídico in: 350 años de la Paz de Westfalia. Del antagonismo a la integración en Europa. Ciclo de conferencias celebrado en la Biblioteca Nacional, Madrid 9 de marzo a 30 de noviembre de 1998 (Madrid, 1999) 33-52.
 La paix de Vervins (2 mai 1598): souveraineté, territorialité et le développement du droit public européen in: Jean-Marie Cauchies en Serge Dauchy (eds.),  Personnalité, territorialité et droit. Actes des Journées internationales de la Société d'Histoire du Droit tenues à Bruxelles du 28 au 31 mai 1998 (Brussels, 1999) 131-152.
 Vrede in de ontwikkeling van het internationaal recht, in: Onze Alma Mater, 54 (2000) 226-250.
 De opmars van de wetgeving in de continentale juridische traditie in: Bart van Klink and Willem J. Witteveen (eds)., De overtuigende wetgever (Deventer, 2000) 29-44.
 De opkomst en de ontwikkeling van de permanente diplomatie. Diplomatieke onschendbaarheid en de opkomst van het moderne volkenrecht in: Peter Van Kemseke (ed.), Diplomatieke cultuur (Leuven, 2000) 37-49.
 Tussen menselijk en eeuwig recht. Sophocles, Antigonè in: Willem Witteveen and Sanne Taekema (eds.), Verbeeldingsmacht. Wat juristen moeten lezen (The Hague, 2000) 321-326.
 Petrus Gudelinus, De jure pacis commentarius : een vroege bijdrage tot de volkenrechtsleer, in: Pro Memorie: Bijdragen tot de rechtsgeschiedenis der Nederlanden, 3 (2001) 67-96.
 The Scholar as a Judge: Romeins recht en algemene beginselen van privaatrecht bij sir Hersch Lauterpacht (1897-1960) in: Erik-Jan Broers and Bart van Klink (eds.), De rechter als rechtsvormer (The Hague, 2001) 65-87.
 Cedant arma togae. De vrede van Athis-sur-Orge (1305) in: Paul Trio, Dirk Heirbaut and Dirk van den Auweele (eds.), Omtrent 1302 (Leuven, 2002) 161-181.
 Iudex, magistratus, senator (1633). Franciscus Zypaeus over het publiekrecht in: Erik-Jan Broers en Beatrix Jacobs, ed., Interactie tussen wetgever en rechter voor de Trias Politica (The Hague, 2003) 29-48.
 De justitie en de media in: Dirk Heirbaut, Xavier Rousseaux and Karel Velle (eds.), Politieke en sociale geschiedenis van justitie in België van 1830 tot heden (Bruges, 2004) 357-368.
 Quod est in codice, est in mundo. Over Federico de Castro, het Romeins recht en het Internationaal Gerechtshof in: Ad amicissimum amici scripsimus. Vriendenboek Raf Verstegen (Bruges, 2004) 180-184.
 Paix et guerre dans les grands traités du dix-huitième siècle, in: Journal of the History of International Law, 7 (2005) 25-41.
 (met Beatrix Jacobs & Erik-Jan Broers,) Ter Inleiding: Rechtshistorisch onderzoek in Tilburg, van regionaal naar internationaal, in: Erik-Jan Broers, Beatrix Jacobs en Randall Lesaffer, eds., Ius Brabanticum, Ius Commune, Ius Gentium: Opstellen aangeboden aan prof. mr. J.P.A. Coopmans ter gelegenheid van zijn tachtigste verjaardag, Nijmegen, Wolf, 2006, 1-8.
 La Tregua de los Doce Años y la formacion del Derecho de Naciones clasica in: Tiempo de Paces (1609-2009). La Pax Hispanica y la Tregua de los Doce Años (Madrid, 2009) 177-191.

Literature
 John Fabian Witt, A Social History of International Law: Historical Commentary, 1861-1900 in David L. Sloss et alii (eds), International Law in the US Supreme Court. Continuity and Change (Cambridge 2011), pp. 164–87.
 Prof Eduard Somers, Laudatio of Prof. Randall Lesaffer, at the presentation of the George Sarton Medal 2012-2013 of the University of Ghent

References

External links
 Profile on Tilburg University
  Profile on University of Leuven
 Website i-HILT, Institute for the History of International Law at Tilburg
  Oxford Historical Treaties 
  Studies in the History of International Law
  Journal of the History of International Law
  Global Law Series
 Sarton medal to Randall Lesaffer

1968 births
Living people
20th-century Belgian historians
Legal historians
Academic staff of Tilburg University
Academic staff of KU Leuven
Writers from Bruges
21st-century Belgian historians